Neoprotoparmelia plurisporibadia is a species of saxicolous (rock-dwelling), crustose lichen in the family Parmeliaceae. It is found in Rio Grande do Sul, Brazil, where it grows on granite rocks in low, open mountainous areas.

Taxonomy
Neoprotoparmelia plurisporibadia was formally described as a new species in 2018 by Garima Singh, Marcela Eugenia da Silva Cáceres, and André Aptroot. Here, in this low open mountain area, it grows on granite rocks. The specific epithet plurisporibadia refers to its multispored asci (pluri, "many"; spori, "spores") and to the colour brown (badia, "dark brown").

Description
The lichen has a light brown to dark brown, areolate thallus, with a thin (or absent) black prothallus around the margin. The apothecia are round (later becoming compressed), measuring  0.4–1.3 mm in diameter, with a smooth, glossy, dark brown disc. The asci (spore-producing structures) are 95 by 15 μm, and they contain about 50 spores. The ascospores measure 7.0–8.0 by 2.5–3.5 μm. Neoprotoparmelia plurisporibadia contains alectoronic acid, a secondary compound that can be detected using the technique thin-layer chromatography.

References

plurisporibadia
Lichen species
Lichens described in 2018
Taxa named by André Aptroot
Lichens of South Brazil
Taxa named by Marcela Cáceres